The dorsal metatarsal veins are veins which drain the metatarsus of the foot.

Veins of the lower limb